WHUZ may refer to:

 WNPP, a radio station (88.5 FM) licensed to serve Cole, Indiana, United States, which held the call sign WHUZ from 2010 to 2019
 WRQI, a radio station (94.3 FM) licensed to serve Saegertown, Pennsylvania, United States, which held the call sign WHUZ from 2000 to 2007